Heinrich Henkel (16 February 1822 – 10 April 1899) was a German composer who studied with Johann Anton André at Offenbach am Main and became a figure of some importance for Mozart research.

He was born in Fulda. In 1860, he founded the predecessor of Frankfurt's municipal music school. Henkel died in Frankfurt am Main.

His brother Georg Andreas Henkel (1805–1871) was also a composer.

References

External links 
 

1822 births
1899 deaths
German composers
Mozart scholars
19th-century composers
19th-century German musicians
19th-century musicologists